Satyanarayanapuram is a village in Cherla mandal, in Khammam district, Telangana.

Villages in Khammam district